Rockford Public Schools or Rockford School District may mean:

 Rockford School District (California) in Tulare County, California — also known as Rockford Elementary School District
 Rockford Public School District 205 in Winnebago County, Illinois
 Rockford Public Schools (Michigan) in Kent County, Michigan
 Rockford Area Schools (Minnesota), in Hennepin County and Wright County, Minnesota — also known as Rockford Area Schools Independent School District 883